Elections to regional councils in the Czech Republic in 13 regions (except Prague) were held on 7 and 8 October 2016.

In one third of constituencies, the elections were combined with Czech Senate elections. Also, several municipal referendums were held, notably in Brno its Central station referendum.

Background
Czech Social Democratic Party has won previous election while its main rival Civic Democratic Party saw large loss o support finishing third. Communist Party of Bohemia and Moravia finished second. 2013 Czech legislative election resulted in political Earthquake as populist ANO 2011 finished second to Social Democrats while Civic Democratic Party was reduced to 5th place.

Czech Social Democratic Party was viewed as front-runner of the election while ANO 2011 was expected to finish second. Civic Democratic Party was expected to become largest right-wing party. Leader of ANO 2011 Andrej Babiš stated that his party is underdog of election and that he hopes to win in 5 regions. Babiš stated that he wants to break rule of Social Democrats and Communists in regions.

Result

Jihomoravský kraj (South Moravian region)

Moravskoslezský kraj (Moravia-Silesia region)

Olomoucký kraj (Olomouc region)

Zlínský kraj (Zlín region)

Královéhradecký kraj (Hradec Králové region)

Pardubický kraj (Pardubice region)

Středočeský kraj (Central Bohemian region)

Kraj Vysočina (Vysočina region)

Plzeňský kraj (Plzeň region)

Jihočeský kraj (South Bohemian region)

Karlovarský kraj (Karlovy Vary region)

Ústecký kraj (Ústí nad Labem region)

Liberecký kraj (Liberec region)

Opinion Polls

Notes

References 

Regional elections in the Czech Republic
2016 elections in the Czech Republic
2016 in the Czech Republic
October 2016 events in Europe
Election and referendum articles with incomplete results